Rip and Red is a middle-grade children's book series written by Phil Bildner, illustrated by Tim Probert, and published by Farrar, Straus and Giroux. The series consists of four books: A Whole New Ball Game (2015), Rookie of the Year (2016), Tournament of Champions (2017), and Most Valuable Players (2018). All four books are Junior Library Guild selections.

Overview

A Whole New Ball Game (2015) 
A Whole New Ballgame was published August 18, 2015.

School Library Journal called the book "[p]ure fun with a lot of heart." Kirkus Reviews noted that the "[c]artoony illustrations lend  energy and personality to the likable cast of characters," making it a "school story with  heart." Publishers Weekly and the Children’s Book Council also proffered positive reviews.

Rookie of the Year (2016) 
Rookie of the Year was published July 12, 2016.

Both Kirkus Reviews and School Library Journal lauded Bildner's characters in Rookie of the Year.

Tournament of Champions (2017) 
Tournament of Champions was published June 6, 2017. The book received a positive review from Kirkus and is a Junior Library Guild selection.

Most Valuable Players (2018) 
Most Valuable Players was published May 29, 2018. The book is a Junior Library Guild selection.

References 

Farrar, Straus and Giroux books
Book series introduced in 2015